Ilya Davydov (born January 25, 1989) is a Russian professional ice hockey defenceman. He is currently playing with HC Rostov in the Supreme Hockey League (VHL). He has formerly played in the Kontinental Hockey League (KHL).

External links

1989 births
Living people
Admiral Vladivostok players
Avtomobilist Yekaterinburg players
HC Izhstal players
Metallurg Novokuznetsk players
Molot-Prikamye Perm players
HK Poprad players
Russian ice hockey defencemen
HC Sarov players
Sportspeople from Yaroslavl
Sputnik Nizhny Tagil players
Torpedo Nizhny Novgorod players
Traktor Chelyabinsk players
Tsen Tou Jilin City players
HC Vityaz players
Yuzhny Ural Orsk players
Russian expatriate sportspeople in China
Russian expatriate sportspeople in Uzbekistan
Russian expatriate sportspeople in Slovakia
Russian expatriate ice hockey people
Expatriate ice hockey players in Uzbekistan
Expatriate ice hockey players in Slovakia
Expatriate ice hockey players in China